Lai Pui Kei (born 30 December 2001) is a Hong Kong professional footballer who currently plays as a attacking midfielder for Hong Kong Premier League club HK U23.

Club career
On 5 July 2019, Lai signed his first professional contract, agreeing to a deal with Hong Kong Premier League club Happy Valley.

Career statistics

Club

Notes

References

External links
 
 Lai Pui Kei on HKFA
 

2001 births
Living people
Hong Kong footballers
Association football midfielders
Happy Valley AA players
HK U23 Football Team players
Hong Kong Premier League players